Anubandham is a 1984 Telugu-language drama film directed by A. Kodandarami Reddy. The film stars Akkineni Nageswara Rao, Raadhika and Sujatha, with music composed by Chakravarthy. It is a remake of the Bengali film Uttar Purush (1966) which was previously remade in Tamil as Uyarndha Manithan (1968).

Plot 
The film begins with Rajesh the son of a multi-millionaire visiting their estate with his besties’ driver Ranganna & Dr. Gopal, where Rajesh meets tribal girl Malli and they fall in love. Soon they secretly espouse with the help of Gopal and start living happily. After a few months, Malli becomes pregnant when Rajesh's father arrives at the estate and becomes furious knowing Rajesh's marriage. So, he orders his henchmen to set on fire to Malli's house when Rajesh assumes she is dead. But fortuitously, she escapes, is cared for by Ramanaiah, and dies after giving birth to a child. As time passes, Rajesh is forcibly knitted to Sujatha, the daughter of his father's friend. Years roll by, Rajesh and Sujatha remain childless and Rajesh still lives in the memories of Malli. Satya Murthy, the son of Rajesh & Malli is unable to retain any job due to his straightforward nature. At present, the wheel of fortune makes him land as a servant at Rajesh's house where he soon acquires his father's affection & appreciation which makes Sujatha jealous. Meanwhile, Gopal discovers the birth of Satya Murthy but before revealing it, dies out of a heart attack. Parallelly, Satya Murthy loves Gowri, the daughter of Ranganna and Rajesh give acceptance for their marriage. Due to the higher influence of Satya Murthy on Rajesh, the remaining servants feel envious and throw the blame for theft on him. Then, enraged Rajesh necks him out when, fortunately, he witnesses Malli's photograph and gets shocked to know that Satya Murthy is his son. Thereafter, Rajesh reveals the entire story to Sujatha who repents and they rush in search of Satya Murthy when depressed Satya Murthy, attempts suicide but Rajesh saves him. Finally, the entire family is united and the movie ends on a happy note with the marriage of Satya Murthy & Gowri.

Cast 

Akkineni Nageswara Rao as Rajesh
Raadhika as Malli
Sujatha as Sujatha
Jaggayya as Dr. Gopal
Karthik/Murali as Satya Murthy
Prabhakar Reddy as Ranganna
Allu Ramalingaiah as Shankaraiah
Nagesh as Tata Rao
Raavi Kondala Rao as Ramanaiah
Chalapati Rao as Rowdy
Bhimeswara Rao as Raghupati Rao
Hema Sundar as Pedda Dora
Tulasi as Gowri
Radha Kumari as Ramanaiah's wife
Girija as Girija
Mamatha as Aliveelu
Jaya Vijaya as Vijaya
Nirmalamma as Nirmala

Soundtrack 
Music was composed by Chakravarthy.

References

External links 
 
 

1980s Telugu-language films
1984 drama films
1984 films
Films directed by A. Kodandarami Reddy
Films scored by K. Chakravarthy
Indian drama films
Telugu remakes of Bengali films